Duisburg was bombed a number of times by the Allies during World War II. The most devastating air raids on Duisburg occurred during October 1944 when the city was bombed by the Royal Air Force (RAF).

Duisburg was a major logistical centre in the Ruhr Area and location of chemical, steel and iron industries, Duisburg was a primary target of Allied bombers. Not only the industrial areas but also residential areas were attacked by Allied bombs. As an entry to the Ruhr, the city received daily warnings of bombing raids in 1943.

In the period 1939 to 1945 the Royal Air Force dropped a total of 30,025 long tons of bombs on Duisburg.

Battle of the Ruhr
During the "Battle of the Ruhr" in 1943, 577 British bombers destroyed the old city on 12/13 May, with 1,599 tonnes of bombs: 96,000 people were made homeless.

Operation Hurricane
In October 1944, Duisburg became the main target in Operation Hurricane a joint RAF Bomber Command and USAAF Eighth Air Force operation.

On 14 October 1944 just after daybreak, RAF Bomber Command sent 1,013 aircraft, with RAF fighters providing an escort, to bomb Duisburg. 957 bombers dropped 3,574 tonnes of high explosive and 820 tonnes of incendiaries on the city for a loss of 14 aircraft. The same day Eighth Air Force sent 1,251 heavy bombers escorted by 749 fighters to bomb targets in the area of Cologne.   
Later the same day, during the night of 14 October/15 October, 1,005 RAF bombers returned to Duisburg in two waves about two hours apart, and dropped a further 4,040 tonnes of high explosive and 500 tonnes of incendiaries for the loss of seven aircraft. The same night a further 230 aircraft destroyed Brunswick.

During Operation Hurricane nearly 9,000 tonnes of bombs fell on Duisburg in less than 24 hours, but the damage to Duisburg is difficult to assess because much of the documentation including the final report (Endbericht), is not held by the Duisburg state archive (Stadtarchiv). However the documentation which is available mentions "Very serious property damage. A large number of people buried." and that at the Thyssen Mines III and IV 8 days production was lost.

Chronology

See also
 List of strategic bombing over Germany in World War II

Notes

References

Carter, Kit C.; Mueller,  Robert (1991). U.S. Army Air Forces in World War II: Combat Chronology 1941 - 1945, Center for Air Force History Washington, DC.

World War II strategic bombing of Germany
Firebombings
Duisburg
Aerial operations and battles of World War II involving the United Kingdom
Germany–United Kingdom military relations
Germany–United States military relations